The Episcopal Diocese of Alaska is the diocese of the Episcopal Church in the United States of America with jurisdiction over the state of Alaska. Established in 1895, it has the largest geographical reach of any diocese in the Episcopal Church, with approximately 6,000 members spread across 46 congregations. It is in Province 8. It has no cathedral and the diocesan offices are located in Fairbanks.

History
Anglicanism first came to Alaska by Canadian Anglican missionaries who went to upper Yukon and Tanana. Missionaries from the Episcopal Church arrived in Anvik in 1887. The Reverend Octavius Parker from Oregon and the Reverend John Chapman from New York City founded Christ Church mission on the lower Yukon River. Missionary work continued in 1890 when an Episcopal missionary doctor, John Driggs arrived in Point Hope on the Arctic Coast to start a school and to minister to the medical needs of the Iñupiat people. Driggs lived in Point Hope for 18 years. In 1895, the Reverend Peter Trimble Rowe was elected the first bishop of Alaska. He came into the country across the Chilkoot Trail focusing mostly on the medical needs of gold miners in the gold rush towns and on the Native people, who were falling prey to many diseases brought by the 'white man'. Consequently Bishop Rowe founded hospitals around the whole territory. The church also established boarding schools for orphaned Native children. In 1971 the Diocese of Alaska was established.

Bishop of Alaska
Following the resignation in 2007 of Mark MacDonald, Bishop of Alaska, to become the first National Indigenous Bishop of the Anglican Church of Canada, the diocese embarked on a lengthy discernment process about its future leadership. Recognizing that the vacancy would likely be lengthy, the diocesan convention elected as assisting bishop, Rustin R. Kimsey, retired bishop of Eastern Oregon and former assisting bishop for Navajoland, to exercise episcopal functions pending the election and installation of a new diocesan bishop. In 2009, the diocese announced a process for election of the 8th bishop of Alaska, and the 35th Diocesan Convention, on April 10, 2010, elected Mark Lattime, Rector of St. Michael's Episcopal Church in Geneseo in the Diocese of Rochester (New York), as the 8th bishop of Alaska. His episcopal ordination took place on September 4, 2010, at the First United Methodist Church in Anchorage.

List of bishops

Resolutions of the 2007 Diocesan Convention
The 33rd Convention of the Episcopal Diocese of Alaska, held in 2007, adopted several resolutions that may, in due course, markedly influence the ministry of the diocese. These resolutions included:

Resolution 2007–01 – Indigenous Suffragan
 Therefore, be it resolved that the 33rd Convention of the Diocese of Alaska supports the Interior Deanery in calling upon the next Bishop of Alaska to call for the election of an Indigenous Suffragan Bishop to serve the Native peoples of Alaska within eighteen months of consecration. Be it further resolved that the Indigenous Suffragan Bishop will provide pastoral and spiritual care for our Indigenous Congregations.

Resolution 2007–02 – Suffragan Bishop Task Force
 The 33rd Convention of the Episcopal Diocese of Alaska encourages our next Diocesan Bishop to consider a Suffragan bishop for Indigenous Ministries. Be it further resolved The 33rd Convention of the Episcopal Diocese of Alaska establish immediately a Suffragan Bishop’s Task Force to develop a plan for implementation of this resolution, to be acted upon by our newly elected Diocesan Bishop, within 12 months of his or her consecration.

Historic parish churches

Several parish churches are listed on the National Register of Historic Places:
 Holy Trinity Church (Juneau, Alaska)
 St. Peter's Episcopal Church (Seward, Alaska)
 St. Philip's Episcopal Church (Wrangell, Alaska)
 St. Peter's by-the-Sea Episcopal (Sitka, Alaska)

See also

 List of bishops of the Episcopal Church in the United States of America

References

External links
 
 Historical resources on Anglicanism in Alaska from Project Canterbury
 Journal of the Annual Convention, Diocese of Alaska

Anglican dioceses established in the 19th century
Alaska
 
Religious organizations established in 1895
Non-profit organizations based in Fairbanks, Alaska
1895 establishments in Alaska
Province 8 of the Episcopal Church (United States)